The 2nd Cavalry Corps were a corps of the Red Army, formed twice.  Originally formed in 1922, the corps served in Ukraine during the Interwar period and fought in the Soviet invasion of Poland.

History

First Formation 
The corps was formed on 31 October 1922 in Uman, with the 4th (later 3rd) Cavalry Division, part of the Ukrainian Military District and commanded by Grigory Kotovsky. After Kotovsky was killed on 6 August 1925, he was replaced by Nikolai Krivoruchko who was promoted to Komkor in 1935 and who led the corps until July 1937. On 29 April 1927, it was named in honor of the Council of People's Commissars of the Ukrainian SSR. The 5th and 14th Cavalry Divisions joined the corps in 1930 and 1931, respectively. In 1935, the corps became part of the Kiev Military District when the Ukrainian Military District was split. In July 1937 Kombrig (later Komdiv) Mikhail Hatskilevich took command of the corps. Komdiv Fyodor Kostenko commanded the corps from April 1939 to 26 July 1940. It took part in the Soviet invasion of Poland in 1939 as part of the 6th Army. In 1940, the 9th Cavalry Division joined the corps, which had become part of the Odessa Military District. Until the beginning of Operation Barbarossa, the German invasion of the Soviet Union, on 22 June 1941, the corps were stationed in the area of Lvov and Northern Bukovina. On 14 March of that year, Major General Pavel Belov took command of the corps.

On 26 November 1941, the 2nd Cavalry Corps became the 1st Guards Cavalry Corps.

Second Formation 
The corps was reformed on 23 December 1941, part of the Southern Front. It was commanded by Maj. Gen. Matvei Usenko. It included the 62nd, 64th, and the 70th Cavalry Divisions. The corps moved to the Southwestern Front, where its 64th Cavalry Division was replaced by the 38th Cavalry Division. In May 1942, it fought in the Second Battle of Kharkov as part of the 6th Army, and was almost entirely wiped out. The corps was officially disbanded on 15 July 1942.

Commanders 
The corps' first formation was commanded by the following officers.
 Grigory Kotovsky (30.10.1922 – 06.08.1925; killed)
 (promoted to Komkor 1935) Nikolai Krivoruchko (13.08.1925 — 07.1937)
 Mikhail Khatskilevich (6.07.1937 — 04.1939) 
 Fyodor Kostenko (04.1939 — 26.07.1940)
 Fyodor Kamkov (26.07.1940 — 14.03.1941)
 Pavel Belov (14.03.1941 — 26.11.1941)

Subordination 
 1922 - 1922 - The Armed Forces of Ukraine and Crimea.
 1922-1935 - The Ukrainian Military District.
 1935 - 1938 - The Kiev military district.
 1938 -1940 - Cavalry Army Group, Kiev Special Military District,.
 1940 - 1941 - Odessa military district.
 1941-1941 - the 9th separate army.
 c 1941 - the 9th separate army of the Southern Front.

Command structure of the corps

Military Commissioner: ( Commissar (in the military unit) ) 
battalion commissar Ilyin (on 07.1938).
brigade commissar Konstantin Vasilyevich Krainyukov (since 12.04.1939, on 10.05.1939-1940).

Deputy corps commander 
brigade commissar Konstantin Vasilievich Krainyukov (since 12.04.1939, 1940-16.07.1941).

Military Commissioner 
brigade commissar Konstantin Vasilyevich Krainyukov (vrid since 12.04.1939, 16.07-25.08.1941).
regimental commissar, brigade commissar Alexey Varfolomeevich Shchelakovsky (25.08.1941-26.11.1941).

Chief of staff 
Alexander Sergeevich Sheydeman (in 1933).
brigade commander Sergei Ilyich Bailo (arrested September 12, 1937).
Pavel Alekseevich Kurochkin (06-10.1939).
Brigade Commander Pyotr Vasilievich Kotelkov (on 05-08.1940).
Colonel Mikhail D. Gretsov (06-11.1941).

Organization 
 3rd Cavalry Division
 5th Cavalry Division
 14th Cavalry Division
 24th Light Tank Brigade

References

Citations

Bibliography 
 

Cavalry corps of the Soviet Union
Military units and formations established in 1922
Military units and formations disestablished in 1942